Zeionises (Greek:  ,   (epigraphic); Kharosthi:  , ,  , ;) was an Indo-Scythian satrap.

Name
Zeionises's name appears on his coins in the Greek form   and the Kharosthi form , and on a silver vase from Taxila in the Kharosthi form , which are derived from Saka name , meaning "benefactor"

Reign
Zeionises was a satrap of the area of southern Chach (Kashmir) for king Azes II.

He then became king, and ruled in parts of the Indian subcontinent around 10 BCE – 10 CE, but apparently lost his territory to the invasion of the Indo-Parthians.

His coins bear the Buddhist Triratna symbol on the obverse, and adopt representations of Greek divinities such as the city goddess Tyche.

A silver jug found at Taxila indicates that Zeionises was "satrap of Chuksa, son of Manigula, brother of the great king", but who this king was remains uncertain.

See also
Yuezhi
Greco-Bactrian Kingdom
Indo-Greek Kingdom
Indo-Parthian Kingdom
Kushan Empire

References

Sources
 "The Shape of Ancient Thought. Comparative studies in Greek and Indian Philosophies" by Thomas McEvilley (Allworth Press and the School of Visual Arts, 2002) 
 "The Greeks in Bactria and India", W.W. Tarn, Cambridge University Press.

External links
 Coins of Zeionises
Indo-Scythian chronology

Indo-Scythian kings
Indo-Scythian satraps
1st-century BC rulers in Asia
1st-century monarchs in Asia
1st-century BC Iranian people
1st-century Iranian people